The 1992–93 season was Dynamo Dresden's third season in the Bundesliga, and they finished in 15th place, just above the relegation zone. Although Dynamo were never in the relegation places at any point during the season, they were let down by a lack of goals - they were the division's lowest scorers with 32, and no player managed more than six goals all season. This situation was probably not helped by the departure of last season's top scorer Torsten Gütschow to Galatasaray, midway through the season, although one positive was the emergence of future-UEFA Champions League winner Alexander Zickler, one of a number of youth team products promoted to the first team this season.

Dynamo reached the second round of the DFB-Pokal, being eliminated by VfB Leipzig of the 2. Bundesliga in a Saxony derby.

Squad

Results

Bundesliga

DFB-Pokal

Transfers

External links
Season details at fussballdaten 

Dynamo Dresden seasons
Dynamo Dresden